The 1974 Daytona 500, the 16th running of the event, was won by Richard Petty (for the fifth time) after three hours, eleven minutes, and thirty-eight seconds of racing on February 17, 1974, at Daytona International Raceway in Daytona Beach, Florida, USA.

During the start of the 1974 NASCAR season, many races had their distance cut ten percent in response to the energy crisis of the year. As a result, the 1974 Daytona 500, won by Richard Petty (his second straight, making him the first driver ever to do it), was shortened to 180 laps (450 miles), as symbolically, the race "started" on Lap 21 and the race is often known as the Daytona 450. The Twin 125 qualifying races (won by Bobby Isaac in a Banjo Matthews Chevrolet and Cale Yarborough in the Richard Howard Chevy prepared by Junior Johnson) were also shortened to 45 laps (112.5 miles).

Summary
First Daytona 500 starts for Bob Burcham, Richie Panch, George Follmer, Lennie Pond, Jackie Rogers, Joe Mihalic, and Richard Childress. Only Daytona 500 starts for Jimmy Crawford, L. D. Ottinger, Dick Simon, Tony Bettenhausen Jr., and Dan Daughtry. Last Daytona 500 starts for Bobby Isaac and Gary Bettenhausen.

Coo Coo Marlin would get his only ever lead lap finish at this race.

ABC Sports announced a week before the race that the event's second half would be televised live, opening with a recap of the event's opening laps. Keith Jackson handled play-by-play commentary with Jackie Stewart providing color commentary. Chris Economaki reported from pit road.

The race was the most competitive in Daytona history with 59 official lead changes (a record that stood until the 2011 Daytona 500, which saw 74 lead changes) among 15 leaders (this record was tied in 1989, then broken in 2006 at 18 and 2010 at 21, and 2011 with 22). Richard Petty and Donnie Allison combined to lead 29 times for 120 laps while other strong cars included Yarborough, Bobby Allison, A. J. Foyt (who started 35th), Coo Coo Marlin (started 31st), and pole-sitter David Pearson.

The race saw two dramatic changes in outcome in the final twenty laps. Richard Petty cut a tire and had to pit under green with 19 laps to go, putting Donnie Allison into the lead. But with 11 laps to go, Bob Burcham blew an engine in the trioval just in front of Donnie Allison. It caused Allison's Chevy to blow out a tire and spin out near turn one while leading. Allison then lost a lap limping back to pit road to get fresh tires. Petty re-took the lead and won by a margin of 47 seconds. Yarborough was second, followed by Ramo Stott, Marlin, Foyt, and Donnie Allison. Marlin might have finished second, but mistook the white flag for the checkered, since both were being displayed when they crossed the line to get the white flag, as Petty was right behind them. Marlin let off on the back straightaway, and lost second to Yarborough, while Stott, known at the time mostly for his USAC stock car prowess, followed to take third, while Marlin had to settle for fourth.

Notes

Daytona 500
Daytona 500
Daytona 500
NASCAR races at Daytona International Speedway